Stereobalanus is a genus of acorn worms belonging to the family Harrimaniidae.

The species of this genus are found in Europe and Northern America.

Species:

Stereobalanus canadensis 
Stereobalanus willeyi

References

Enteropneusta